The Insurance Brokers (Registration) Act 1977 was an Act of the Parliament of the United Kingdom. It set out a scheme for the regulation of insurance brokers, through registration with the Insurance Brokers Registration Council (IBRC). The Act was repealed in 2001, and the IBRC dissolved.

See also 
 Financial Services Authority

References 

United Kingdom Acts of Parliament 1977
Repealed United Kingdom Acts of Parliament
Law of the United Kingdom